EER may refer to:

 East of England Regiment, a British Army Reserve unit
 Effective exchange rate
 Energy efficiency rating in the Australian Capital Territory
 Energy efficiency ratio, of a cooling device
 Engineering education research
 Enhanced entity–relationship model
 Enlisted Evaluation Report, used by the United States Army
Equal Error Rate, see Biometrics
 Equine exertional rhabdomyolysis
 Estonian Greens, a political party in Estonia
European Economic Review, a scholarly journal
 Experimental event rate
 West Virginia Mountaineers, the athletic teams that represent West Virginia University

See also
 Energy Efficiency and Renewable Energy (EERE), a U.S. government office